X26 or X-26  may refer to:
 X26 (New York City bus), a former bus route
 London Buses route X26, a bus route from Heathrow Airport to West Croydon
 X26, the location identifier of Sebastian Municipal Airport, Florida, United States
 X-26 Frigate, a former research and training aircraft of the United States Navy
 Taser X26, an electroshock weapon that uses electric current to disrupt voluntary control of muscles